Miria Obote (née Kalule; born 16 July 1936) is a Ugandan politician who was first lady of Uganda, and widow of former Prime Minister and President Milton Obote. She was a candidate in the 2006 Ugandan general election.

Background and Education 
Miria Kalule was born in Kawempe, to Bulasio Kalule, a civil servant who worked with the Department of Road Maintenance in the Ministry of Works and his wife Malita.

She attended Gayaza High School and later Makerere University.

Miria Obote returned to Uganda from Zambia in October 2005, after 20 years in exile, to bury her husband. Two months later, she was elected as head of the Uganda People's Congress (UPC) and as its presidential candidate for the next election. The UPC was founded by her husband and led by him until his death. She garnered 0.6% of the vote in the February 23, 2006 presidential election, which was won by the sitting president, Yoweri Museveni.

Personal life 
Miria married Milton Obote in November 1963 and they had 4 children between them including Jimmy Akena, a Member of Parliament representing Lira Municipality.

References
Walking in Obote’s shadow, The Monitor, December 21, 2005.

1936 births
Living people
First Ladies of Uganda
Uganda People's Congress politicians
21st-century Ugandan women politicians
21st-century Ugandan politicians
Makerere University alumni
People educated at Gayaza High School